Vial Island, also known as Wei Island and Jacquinot Island, is a volcanic island in the Schouten Islands of Papua New Guinea.

Islands of Papua New Guinea